The West Twin River, formerly the Neshota River, is an  river in east-central Wisconsin that is a tributary to Lake Michigan. It merges with the East Twin River in the city of Two Rivers, Wisconsin, less than a mile from the lakeshore. The source of the river is in southeast Brown County, near Richard J. Drum Memorial Forest. It is formed by the confluence of the Devils River and the Neshota River. On its course it passes through the unincorporated communities of Kingsbridge and Shoto.

The river below Shoto Dam is broad, shallow, and slow and the water quality is poor, while above the dam it is narrow, deep, and fast-flowing with good to excellent water quality. Shoto Dam creates a  reservoir known as Shoto Lake.

Major tributaries
Major tributaries of the West Twin River include:
Black (Buck) Creek
Devils River
Francis Creek
King Creek
Kriwanek Creek
Neshota River
Twin Hill Creek

See also
 List of rivers of Wisconsin

References

Rivers of Wisconsin
Rivers of Brown County, Wisconsin
Rivers of Manitowoc County, Wisconsin